Migues is a small city in the Canelones Department of southern Uruguay.

Migues is also the name of the municipality to which the town belongs.

Geography

Location

History
On 27 June 1870, a "Pueblo" (village) named "Carmen" was created by the Act of Ley Nº 1.112 on the land belonging to Nicasia Figueredo de Migues, between two streams of the Solís river. It probably corresponds to the village eventually named "Migues". On 15 May 1925, its status was elevated to "Villa" (town) by the Act of Ley Nº 7.837. On 26 June 1970, its status was further elevated to "Ciudad" (city) by the Act of Ley Nº 13.866.

Population
According to the 2011 census, Migues had a population of 2,109. In 2010, the Intendencia de Canelones had estimated a population of 3,720 for the municipality during the elections.

 
Source: Instituto Nacional de Estadística de Uruguay

Places of worship
 Parish Church of Our Lady of Mt. Carmel (Roman Catholic)

References

External links
INE map of Migues

Populated places in the Canelones Department